Pseudochrobactrum kiredjianiae is a bacterium from the genus of Paenochrobactrum which was isolated in Nelson in New Zealand.

References

External links
Type strain of Pseudochrobactrum kiredjianiae at BacDive -  the Bacterial Diversity Metadatabase

Hyphomicrobiales
Bacteria described in 2007